Ptychadena superciliaris is a species of frog in the family Ptychadenidae.
It is found in Ivory Coast, Ghana, Guinea, Liberia, and Sierra Leone.
Its natural habitats are subtropical or tropical moist lowland forest and intermittent freshwater marshes.
It is threatened by habitat loss.

References

Ptychadena
Taxonomy articles created by Polbot
Amphibians described in 1858
Taxa named by Albert Günther